USS Hotham may refer to more than one United States Navy ship:

 USS Hotham (DE-574), a destroyer escort transferred to the United Kingdom while under construction which served in the Royal Navy as the frigate  from 1944 to 1952

United States Navy ship names